1-Phosphatidylinositol-4,5-bisphosphate phosphodiesterase beta-3 is an enzyme that in humans is encoded by the PLCB3 gene.

The gene codes for the enzyme phospholipase C β3. The enzyme catalyzes the formation of inositol 1,4,5-trisphosphate and diacylglycerol from phosphatidylinositol 4,5-bisphosphate. This reaction uses calcium as a cofactor and plays an important role in the intracellular transduction of many extracellular signals. This gene is activated by two G-protein alpha subunits, alpha-q and alpha-11, as well as G-beta gamma subunits.

Interactions 

PLCB3 has been shown to interact with Sodium-hydrogen exchange regulatory cofactor 2.

References

Further reading 

 
 
 
 
 
 
 
 
 
 
 
 
 
 
 
 
 
 
 

EC 3.1.4